The Byzantine Discalced Carmelites are communities of Discalced Carmelites that operate in several Eastern Catholic Churches, namely the Bulgarian Byzantine Catholic Church, the Melkite Greek Catholic Church, the Ruthenian Greek Catholic Church, the Ordinariate for Eastern Catholics in France and the Romanian Greek Catholic Church.

Around the world

Bulgaria
Discalced Carmelite friars are resident in Bulgaria.

Lebanon
The Carmel of the Mother of God and Unity in Harissa, Lebanon was inaugurated on 24 August 1962 by Mgr Philip Nabaa (1907-1967), the Melkite Metropolitan Archbishop of Beirut and Byblos (1948-1967). Due to the many vocations a second Carmel was founded on 9 July 2005 in Kfarmasshoun, near Byblos. The Carmel of the Mother of God and Unity in Harissa was visited by Pope John Paul II on 11 May 1997 and by Pope Benedict XVI on 16 September 2012 during their apostolic trips to Lebanon.

United States

It was out of a desire for Christian reconciliation and inspired by Pope John XXIII and the Second Vatican Council that the Byzantine Carmel was brought to life.  Holy Annunciation Carmel's founding sisters, Mother Marija of the Holy Spirit, Sister Marie Helen of the Cross and Sister Ann of the Trinity (d. 2001) offered their lives for the healing of the Body of Christ with the inauguration of the monastery at Sugarloaf, Pennsylvania, on 23 February 1977.
The Most Reverend Michael Dudick (1916–2007), the bishop of the Ruthenians of Passaic, New Jersey, assumed the total burden of financial responsibility and assisted the community for years.

Father Walter Ciszek, S.J., both guided the sisters in the establishment of this new foundation and introduced the community to Bishop Michael.

"Divine providence directed us to the Ruthenian people and their diocese of Passaic NJ, which stems from the Uzhgorod-Mukachevo eparchy in Transcarpathia (now Ukraine).  At the time of founding Holy Annunciation, Communism was in full force and daily we prayed for "our suffering brethren" (behind the iron curtain). As Communism weakened and then collapsed (1989-1990) we received requests, even applications, from young women in Byzantine Slovakia and Carpathia who felt they had a Carmelite vocation.  Several Byzantine rite girls came to us from Slovakia and Carpathia. We in turn promised, when feasible, that a foundation would be made in their homeland.  This has been our endeavor since 1995, and in 2002 we sent Sisters there to begin the Monastery of St. Therese in Koritnyani, Transcarpathia." - Mother Marija

In 1999, the community, through an unusual chain of events, accepted five young women of the South Indian Syro-Malabar Catholic Church as members.  These sister comprise one third of the community.  Bishop Dudick encouraged the assistance of sister Eastern Catholic Churches.

The community now follows the Rule of Saint Benedict.

France
In 1964, the Second Vatican Council's Decree on Ecumenism received an enthusiastic welcome in the Carmel of Nancy; then, with the agreement of the community, the Prioress, Mother Elisabeth, considered founding an Eastern-rite Carmel. Little by little, the details of the project were worked out; it was encouraged by the Superiors of the Order and received Pope Paul VI's blessing. After friendly consultations with several representatives of the Orthodox Church in France, a statute approved by the Bishop allowed the Sisters who were committed to the project to pray the Byzantine-rite Office. In 1971, this "Eastern branch" transferred to the Carmel in Nogent- sur-Marne, close to Paris, enabling the Sisters to become better acquainted with Orthodox Christianity and to be trained in iconography.
With the authorisation of the Bishops of Nancy and Dijon, the Monastery of St. Elijah was founded in Saint Remy (Côte d'Or) in 1974 by four Carmelites from Nancy.
In 1981, after the five year review of the project, the review commission authorized the opening of a novitiate. In 1986, the Monastery was established as a Carmel of the Byzantine Rite under the jurisdiction of the Ordinariate for Eastern Catholics in France, which delegates its authority to the Bishop of Dijon, making it the fourth Byzantine-rite Carmel in existence, after Sofia (Bulgaria), Harissa (Lebanon) and Sugarloaf (Pennsylvania).

Romania
In response to an invitation from the Greek Catholic Metropolitan in Romania, Mgr Lucian Muresan, on 14 September 1994, the feast of the Triumph of the Cross, the Monastery of St. Elijah laid the foundations of a skete in Stânceni, a village set in the Carpathian Mountains. The Skete is dedicated to the Holy Cross which unites all Christians as they await the resurrection. Situated on the outskirts of a village whose inhabitants are Orthodox, Catholic or Protestant, it is a place of prayer for Unity.

See also
 Byzantine Catholic Eparchy of Passaic

References

External links
Official Website of the Discalced Carmelite Nuns of the Byzantine Catholic Church
Official Facebook page of the Discalced Carmelite Nuns of the Byzantine Catholic Church
Saint Elijah Byzantine Carmelite Monastery, Saint Remy, France (in French)
Byzantine Carmelite Monastery and Fraternity of St. Elie in Saint Remy, France (defunct English website)
Holy Cross Skete, Stânceni, Romania
Discalced Carmelite Calendar and Saints
 Desert Mothers of Europe

Byzantine hermits

Eastern Catholic orders and societies
Carmelite spirituality
Ruthenian Greek Catholics
Syro-Malabar Catholic Church
Christian monasticism
Rusyn-American culture in Pennsylvania
Discalced Carmelite Order